Baile Boidheach is a hamlet in Argyll and Bute, Scotland.

Villages in Knapdale